Türkmən or Tyurkman or Tyurkmen may refer to:
Türkmən, Barda, Azerbaijan
Türkmən, Goychay, Azerbaijan
Türkmən, Qabala, Azerbaijan

See also
Turkmen